Elias of Cortona was born, it is said, at Bevilia near Assisi, ca. 1180; he died at Cortona, 22 April 1253. He was among the first to join St. Francis of Assisi in his newly founded Order of Friars Minor. In 1221, Francis appointed Elias Vicar General.

Biography

Early life
According to Salimbene di Adam, who knew Elias well, his family name was Bonusbaro or Bonibarone, that his father was from the neighbourhood of Bologna, and his mother from Assisi. Before becoming a friar, Elias worked at his father's trade of mattress-making and also taught the children of Assisi to read the Psalter. Later on, according to Thomas of Eccleston, Elias was a scriptor, or notary, at Bologna, where no doubt he applied himself to study. He was not a cleric and never became a priest, but was a lay brother with significant organizational skills.

Elias appears to have been one of the earliest companions of Francis of Assisi. The time and place of his joining the saint are uncertain; it may have been at Cortona in 1211, as Luke Wadding says. It is certain, however, that he held a place of prominence among the friars from the first. After a short sojourn in Tuscany, Elias was sent in 1217 as head of a band of missionaries to the Near East, and two years later he became the first provincial of the then extensive province of Syria. It was in this capacity that he received Cæsar of Speyer into the order. Although it is unclear what the nature or extent of Elias's work in the East, it would seem that the three years he spent there made a deep impression upon him.

Vicar general
On his return from Acre in 1220, Francis brought Elias back with him. Francis had appointed Peter of Cataneo as vicar general, to handle the day-to-day administration of the order. When Peter died on 10 March 1221, Francis demonstrated his confidence in Elias by naming him to succeed Peter as vicar-general. Elias had held this office for five years when Francis died on 3 October 1226, and he then became charged with the responsibilities of the moment and superintending the temporary burial of the saint at San Giorgio.

A great patron of the Franciscans and their official Protector, Cardinal Ugolino had shortly before been elected as Pope, and taken the name of Gregory IX. The new Pope immediately declared his intention to build a splendid church to house the body of the Little Poor Man he had known and venerated. The task was entrusted to Brother Elias. Elias at once began to lay plans for the erection of a great basilica at Assisi, to enshrine the remains of the Poverello.

Elias was a lay friar, and encouraged other laymen to enter the order. This brought opposition from many ordained friars and ministers provincial, who also opposed increased centralization of the Order. In order to build the basilica, he obtained a donation, with the authority of the pope, of the so-called Collis Inferni at the western extremity of the town, and proceeded to collect money in various ways to meet the expenses of the building. Elias thus also alienated the zealots in the order, who felt entirely with Francis upon the question of poverty, so that at the chapter held in May, 1227, Elias was rejected in spite of his prominence, and Giovanni Parenti, Minister Provincial of Spain, was elected Minister General of the order.

Minister general
Though Elias had tried for the office of Minister General at the General Chapter of 1230, it was only at the Chapter of 1232 that he was elected. Thus he became, after the founder, the second Minister General of the Order of Friars Minor.  Almost immediately, his succession was a point of controversy and created a split within the Order. Some of his fiercest critics were the first companions of Saint Francis, such as the simple Brother Giles, brother Masseus, and Brother Leo, St. Francis' secretary and companion. All of these earlier followers opposed what they saw as an abandonment of St. Francis' beloved commitment to corporate poverty under Elias' initiative. An example of this was the magnificence of the new Basilica of St. Francis and Sacro Convento Elias was designing as the holy founder's resting place. Still, Elias attempted to uphold the rule of poverty for Francis's early followers, including St. Clare of Assisi, the first female follower of St. Francis, together with whom he had founded the female branch of the Franciscan Order. 
During his administration, Elias worked strenuously to promote the growth of the Order. He dispatched friars to new lands. He authorized the building of large monastic-style residences in the cities, which were to serve as centers of study. This was a departure from the wandering tradition of the Order, with its small and scattered residences or hermitages. This development was to have two consequences. Firstly, it introduced large groups of the growing number of clergy in the Order. This became a source of friction with the local clergy of the cities, as the faithful sought the spiritual services of the friars in preference to their own parish churches. Secondly, there grew a growing distinction between the friars who lived in established communities (convents, thus termed the Conventuals) as opposed to the "Spirituals" who strove to follow Francis' original lifestyle.

About 1238, Pope Gregory sent Elias as an ambassador to the excommunicated Holy Roman Emperor Frederick II; apparently, as a result, Elias became a supporter of the Emperor. A General Chapter of the Order was held in Rome in 1239. From Friar Thomas of Eccleston's account of this Chapter, it appears that one of the chief spokesmen against Elias was Friar Haymo of Faversham. Elias was deposed from the office of Minister General by the Chapter.

After the deposition of Elias, Albert of Pisa, Minister Provincial of England, was elected as Minister General. Elias went to Cortona, where he visited a house of Poor Clares without permission. Albert was prepared to absolve him, but Elias went instead to the Ghibelline city of Arezzo, and Gregory excommunicated him.

Albert died during the first year of his Generalate, and Haymo was then elected to that office in 1240.

In 1240, Elias definitively embraced the Emperor in his strife with Rome and joined the Emperor's army, riding on a magnificent charger at the siege of Faenza and at that of Ravenna. As a consequence of his behaviour, Elias himself received excommunication from Pope Gregory and was expelled from the Order.

Attribution to him of some alchemistic manuscripts is often questioned.

Shortly before his death, Elias was reconciled with both the Holy See and, through the mediation of St. Clare, with the Franciscan Order.

In April 2016, Ave Maria Press published the first-ever popular history about the life of Elias of Cortona, The Enthusiast: How the Best Friend of Francis of Assisi Almost Destroyed What He Started.

Notes

External links
"Elias of Cortona; Elias Bonusbaro; Elias Bonibarone", New Catholic Dictionary, 1910
 

1180s births
1253 deaths
People from Assisi
Italian Friars Minor
Ministers General of the Order of Friars Minor
People temporarily excommunicated by the Catholic Church